Constantine II, (also Constantine IV; Western Armenian transliteration: Gosdantin or Kostantine; died 17 April 1344), born Guy de Lusignan, was elected the first Latin King of Armenian Cilicia of the Poitiers-Lusignan dynasty, ruling from 1342 until his death in 1344.

Life
Guy de Lusignan was the son of Isabella, daughter of Leo II of Armenia, and Amalric, a son of Hugh III of Cyprus, and was governor of Serres from 1328 until 1341. When his cousin Leo IV, the last Hethumid monarch of Cilicia, was murdered by the barons, the crown was offered to his younger brother John, who urged Guy to accept it. Guy was reluctant — his mother and two of his brothers had been murdered by the Armenian regent Oshin of Corycos — but he eventually accepted and took the name Constantine.

Guy was killed in an uprising in Armenia on April 17, 1344 and was succeeded by a distant cousin, Constantine III.

Marriages and issue
Guy married twice, firstly to a Kantakouzene (died c. 1330), without issue, and secondly in 1330–1332, Theodora Syrgiannaina (died 1347/1349), with whom he fathered:
 Isabella of Lusignan (c. or after 1333 – in Cyprus, 1382–1387), Lady of Aradippou, married after February 26, 1349 Manuel Kantakouzenos (c. 1326 – April 10, 1380), Despot of Morea.

References

Sources
 
 
 
 
 
Medieval Lands Project: Kings of Armenia (Cilician Armenia), Lusignan (1342–1375).

House of Poitiers-Lusignan
Kings of the Armenian Kingdom of Cilicia
Year of birth missing
1344 deaths